Brian George John Canty, CBE (born 23 October 1931) is a retired British diplomat who served as Governor of Anguilla from 1989 to 1992. He was the designer of Anguilla's flag, which was first flown in 1990.

Canty was appointed an OBE in 1988 and promoted to CBE in 1993.

References 

1931 births
Possibly living people
Commanders of the Order of the British Empire
Alumni of the University of London
Royal Air Force officers
Members of HM Diplomatic Service
Governors of Anguilla